Haselbury Bridge (sometimes called Haselbury Old Bridge) is a stone built bridge dating from the 14th century in Haselbury Plucknett in the English county of Somerset. It is a scheduled monument and Grade II* listed building.

The two arch bridge was built of local Hamstone  and carries a small road over the River Parrett. Each of the arches has a  span.

In the 17th century it carried the main route between Salisbury and Exeter and later marked the boundary between the Chard and Yeovil turnpike trusts. The bridge was bypassed in 1831.

References

Grade II* listed buildings in South Somerset
Scheduled monuments in South Somerset
Grade II* listed bridges in England